David Davidson (born 25 January 1943 in Edinburgh) is a former Scottish Conservative and Unionist politician. He was a Member of the Scottish Parliament (MSP), serving as one of the additional members for the North East Scotland region, from 1999 to 2007.

Davidson was previously a councillor in Stirling.

While in parliament, he was a director of the Scottish Parliament Business Exchange from 2001 until 2007.

After leaving parliament, he was employed at Caledonia Consulting as a lobbyist along with former Labour politician Mike Watson.

In 2005 Davidson resigned as Conservative Health spokesperson after newspaper reports alleged he had been involved in an affair with SNP MSP Christine Grahame.

References

External links 
 
 David Davidson MSP official site

1943 births
Living people
Conservative MSPs
Scottish Conservative Party councillors
Members of the Scottish Parliament 1999–2003
Members of the Scottish Parliament 2003–2007